The 2018–19 EFL Cup was the 59th season of the EFL Cup. Also known as the Carabao Cup for sponsorship reasons, the competition was open to all 92 clubs participating in the Premier League and the English Football League. The first round was played on 14 August 2018, ten days after the start of the Football League season. Manchester City successfully defended their title, their first step in becoming the first English team to complete a domestic treble for the football season, as they later won the 2018–19 Premier League and the 2018–19 FA Cup. The final was held at Wembley Stadium in London on 24 February 2019.

Format
In June 2018, it was announced that there would be a number of changes to the competition after a vote by all of the English Football League clubs at their annual EFL Summer Conference in Portugal. Extra time would be scrapped for all rounds except for the final with the tie progressing straight to a penalty shoot-out in the event of a draw after 90 minutes. This was introduced in order to reduce "additional fatigue issues". The ABBA penalty system trial would also be scrapped and the format for a penalty shoot-out would return to the ABAB format. Seeding was removed for the first two rounds however the first two rounds remained organised on a regional basis. Video assistant referees (VAR) were also authorised for use at matches played at Premier League club grounds.

Access
All 92 clubs in the Premier League and English Football League entered the season's EFL Cup. Access was distributed across leagues.

In the first round, the draw was regionalised into northern and southern clubs with 22 Championship clubs and all League One and League Two clubs entering in this round.

The following round, the two remaining Championship clubs Swansea City and Stoke City (who finished 18th and 19th respectively in the 2017–18 Premier League season), and the Premier League clubs not involved in either the Champions League or Europa League entered.

Arsenal, Burnley, Chelsea, Liverpool, Manchester City, Manchester United and Tottenham Hotspur all received byes to the third round owing to their participation in European competitions.

The first round draw was held on 15 June 2018 in Vietnam. The second round draw was held on 16 August 2018 in England, drawn by Mick McCarthy and Chris Waddle.

First round
A total of 70 clubs played in the first round: 24 from League Two (tier 4), 24 from League One (tier 3), and 22 from the Championship (tier 2). The draw for this round was split on a geographical basis into 'northern' and 'southern' sections. Teams were drawn against a team from the same section. The draw was made on 15 June 2018.

Northern section

Southern section

Second round
A total of 50 clubs played in the second round with 13 teams from the Premier League joining in this round (teams without international liabilities), also the 2 remaining Championship teams entered. The draw for this round was split on a geographical basis into 'northern' and 'southern' sections. Teams were drawn against a team from the same section.

Northern section

Southern section

Third round
A total of 32 teams played in this round. The seven remaining Premier League clubs involved in European competition joined the 25 match-winners from the second round. The draw was held on 30 August 2018.

Fourth round
The fourth round draw took place on 29 September 2018.

Quarter-finals
The quarter-final draw took place on 31 October and was made by Jamie Redknapp and Jimmy Floyd Hasselbaink.

Semi-finals
The semi-final draw took place on 19 December and was made by Peter Crouch and Piers Morgan.

First leg

Second leg

Final

The final was played at Wembley Stadium.

Broadcasting
These matches were televised live in the UK and Ireland by Sky Sports:

Notes

References

EFL Cup seasons
EFL Cup
EFL Cup
Cup